Verbrugge is a surname. Notable people with the surname include:

Cyrille Verbrugge (1866–1929), Belgian fencer
Jacques Verbrugge (born 1955), Dutch cyclist
Jean Verbrugge (1896–1964), Belgian fencer and orthopedic surgeon
Sven Verbrugge (born 1967), Belgian sidecarcross rider